Langenberg can refer to:

People
Arend Langenberg (1949-2012), Dutch voice actor and radio presenter
Donald N. Langenberg (1932-2019), American physicist
James Van Langenberg, 5th Solicitor General of Ceylon
Silke Langenberg (born 1974) is a German-Swiss heritage scientist and architect

Places
Langenberg (Bad Harzburg), a hill in northwestern Germany with international archaeological and geological importance
Langenberg (Habichtswald), a hill range in the Habichtswald Highlands, Hesse
Langenberg (Reinhardswald), a hill in Hesse
Langenberg (Rothaar), the highest mountain in northwestern Germany, located in the Rothaargebirge mountains
Langenberg (Rhineland), an independent town until 1975, now a borough of Velbert
Langenberg (Westphalia), a municipality in eastern Westphalia

Other
Langenberg transmission tower, Velbert, Germany
Langenberg Wildlife Park, Langnau am Albis, Switzerland

See also
 Langenburg
 Langeberg (disambiguation)